James Kok Ying Chean (born April 27, 1962, in Burma, now known as Myanmar) is a filmmaker in Los Angeles, California, US, comes from a large family of artists in the 1970s. He started as a stunt man and cinematographer in Hong Kong. He is now a well regarded director and producer, living in Los Angeles, CA. His latest directorial feature film Alibi was completed late 2007. It stars Joe Estevez and Marie Zielcke. Other Chean directing films include Silent Scream (1999. TV star Dana Plato's last film) and producer credits include Young Man Kang's The Last Eve (2005) and Soap Girl (2002). James Chean is one of the executive producers of The Singer Down Stairs (2007). He makes a cameo appearance in the final scene of Charlie's Death Wish (2005).

Trivia

He is a huge admirer of the legendary Chinese cinematographer James Wong Howe who shot over 130 films in Hollywood.

Filmography

Horrorween (2010) - Producer
The Ashura Worshipper (2009) - Producer
Born to Kill (2009) - Producer
Horrorween 3D (2008) - Cinematographer
White Wall (2008) - Producer
The Singer Downstairs (short, 2007) - Victor M, Executive Producer, Unit Production Manager
Alibi (2007)- Executive Producer, Producer, Director, Cinematographer, Editor
Last Stop Kew Gardens, Cinematographer (2006)
The Last Eve - Videographer, Executive Producer, Gaffer (2005)
Charlie's Death Wish (video, 2005) - Bartender, Thanks (creator of "Silent Scream") 2005
Death Valley Diary - Executive Producer 2003
Soap Girl - Additional Cinematographer 2002
Silent Scream - Executive Producer, Director, Cinematographer, Editor 1999
Blood Slaves of the Vampire Wolf - Actor 	 1996		
The Surreal Life (TV series) - Ron Jeremy's Sidekick (1 episode, 2005) I'm with Cupid - Ron Jeremy's Sidekick 2005	 	
Korean Report: Young Man Kang Goes to Hollywood (TV documentary) - Guest

External links

James Chean's Official Site
Myanmar Times Profile
YouTube Interview

Living people
American actors
American cinematographers
1962 births